Charles Clark Jamieson was a (November 3, 1866 - August 21, 1935) was an American engineer and officer in the United States Army. A veteran of World War I, he attained the rank of brigadier general during the war.

Early life and education
Charles Clark Jamieson was born on November 3, 1866 in Glover, Vermont to William S. and Isabella (McDowell) Jamieson.  He was raised and educated in Stannard, Vermont, then attended the State Normal School in Johnson from 1882 to 1885. After graduating, he taught school in West Burke. In 1888, Jamieson began attendance at the United States Military Academy, from which he graduated in 1892.

Career
Jamieson served with the 15th Infantry and was stationed at Fort Sheridan from 1892 to 1895. From 1897 to 1900, he was assigned to the Sandy Hook Proving Ground. From 1900 to 1903, Jamieson taught at the United States Military Academy. He then was transferred to the Rock Island Arsenal.

Jamieson received a promotion to major with the Ordnance Department on June 25, 1906. He incurred a disability in the line of duty and retired as a major on October 12, 1910.

As a civilian, Jamieson worked as a manufacturing manager and mechanical engineer, first with the Walter A. Wood Mowing and Reaping Machine Company in Hoosick Falls, New York from 1910 to 1913 and then for Deere & Co. until 1916. He then became a consulting engineer and partner with Goethals, Houston & Jay, with offices in New York, working with fellow West Point graduate George W. Goethals.

On April 13, 1917, Jamieson was recalled to active duty with the Ordnance Department. On January 3, 1919, he retired as a brigadier general and returned to George W. Goethals and Company as Vice President and Partner. In 1923, he again became a consulting engineer, splitting his time between New York and Jacksonville, Florida.

Personal life
Jamieson married Frances Parmalee Floyd on June 12, 1894.  They were the parents of two children.  Frances died on July 20, 1923 and on July 12, 1930, Jamieson married Anne Uezzel.

Death and legacy 
Jamieson died in Ocala, Florida on August 21, 1935. He was buried at West Point Cemetery in West Point, New York.

References

External links

1866 births
1935 deaths
People from Orleans County, Vermont
Johnson State College alumni
United States Military Academy alumni
United States Military Academy faculty
United States Army generals of World War I
United States Army generals
People from Ocala, Florida
Burials at West Point Cemetery